In the run up to the 2001 Polish parliamentary election, various organisations carried out opinion polling to gauge voting intention in Poland. Results of such polls are displayed in this article.

Sejm

2001

2000

1999

1998

1997

Seat projections

Senate

Poland
2001